Facial width to height ratio (fWHR) is a measure derived from archaeological skull measurements.  fWHR may be linked with adolescent testosterone, and has been proposed as: a predictor of aggression, cause of death by violence, and also with CEO success probability.  While most studies have found some significance some have found little correlation.

fWHR has also been used in primate studies with similar findings.

Width is measured as upper bizygomatic width (the widest central bit of the face), height measurement used is upper facial height, from the top of the eyelids (approximately the nasion) to the top lip.  This can cause experimental error when working from photographs in historical studies due to facial expressions.

References

Skull